Ranica (Bergamasque:  or  or  or ; Medieval ) is a comune (municipality) in the Province of Bergamo in the Italian region of Lombardy, located about  northeast of Milan and about  northeast of Bergamo.

Ranica borders the following municipalities: Alzano Lombardo, Gorle, Ponteranica, Scanzorosciate, Torre Boldone, Villa di Serio. Part of Ranica's territory is part of Parco dei Colli di Bergamo.

The town contains the Church of the Santissimi Sette Fratelli Martiri.

Demographic evolution

References

External links 
 www.comune.ranica.bg.it